Senecio linearifolius, commonly known as fireweed groundsel, is a species of flowering plant in the family Asteraceae. It is a small shrub with variable leaves, numerous heads of yellow flowers and grows in Tasmania, New South Wales and Victoria.

Description 
Both surfaces of the leaf are smooth and sparingly to thickly covered in downy white hairs. The individual flowers are in a grouping of 4–8 with a yellow centre. Flowering occurs mostly from November to March.

Taxonomy and naming
Senecio linearifolius was first formally described by Achille Richard and the description was published in Voyage de Decouvertes de l'Astrolabe. Botanique. The specific epithet (linearifolius) means linear leaved.

Distribution and habitat
Fireweed groundsel occurs in south-eastern Australia including Tasmania in moist habitats. In New South Wales it occurs mostly on the ranges south of Tenterfield and west to Nundle. In Victoria it is found in the Grampians, Brisbane Ranges, near Portland and Euroa.

References

linearifolius
Taxa named by Achille Richard
Flora of New South Wales
Flora of Tasmania
Flora of Victoria (Australia)